Modern Machine Shop (ISSN 0026-8003) is a media brand that reports on product technology and process technology being used in North America's CNC machining and metalworking industry. Modern Machine Shop's audience consists primarily of owners, managers, and engineers at OEMs, contract manufacturers, and job shops that machine for industries including automotive, aerospace, electronics, energy, medical/surgical, defense, and construction equipment.

First published in 1928, Modern Machine Shop is the flagship publication of Gardner Business Media. 

Modern Machine Shop'''s qualified, no-charge subscription base is BPA-audited. As of August 2017, monthly circulation was 85,500.

The publisher is Bryce Ellis and the Editor-in-Chief is Pete Zelinski. Editorial offices are located in Cincinnati, Ohio, USA. Modern Machine Shop is published 12 times per year.Modern Machine Shops also maintains a complete suite of multi-media resources used for researching machining and metalworking processes, product technologies and for locating suppliers of equipment and services used in machining and metalworking facilities.  
Sample editorial calendar topics

PartnershipsDomestic:'''
Association for Manufacturing Technology (AMT)
Precision Machined Products Association (PMPA)

Other Gardner Business Media brands
AutoBeat
Modern Machine Shop Mexico
MoldMaking Technology
Production Machining
Products Finishing
Products Finishing Mexico
Plastics Technology
Plastics Technology Mexico
CompositesWorld
Additive Manufacturing

References

External links
MMSOnline

1928 establishments in Ohio
Monthly magazines published in the United States
Magazines established in 1928
Magazines published in Cincinnati
Professional and trade magazines
Business magazines published in the United States